The Standard Time Daily is a newspaper published in Burma. Due to law changes, the paper began freely publishing from 1 April 2013.

References

Daily newspapers published in Myanmar
Newspapers established in 2013
Burmese-language newspapers